Hemis Monastery is a Himalayan Buddhist monastery (gompa) of the Drukpa Lineage, in Hemis, Ladakh, India. Situated 45 km from Leh, it was re-established in 1672 by the Ladakhi king Sengge Namgyal. The annual Hemis festival honouring Padmasambhava is held there in early June.

Hemis village is located 40 km southeast of Leh on Leh-Manali Highway and under-construction Bhanupli–Leh line.

History
Hemis Monastery existed before the 11th century.

In 1894 Russian journalist Nicolas Notovitch claimed Hemis as the origin of an otherwise unknown gospel, the Life of Saint Issa, Best of the Sons of Men, in which Jesus is said to have travelled to India during his 'lost years'. According to Notovitch, the work had been preserved in the Hemis library and was shown to him by the monks there while he was recuperating from a broken leg. But once his story had been re-examined by historians, it is claimed that Notovitch confessed to having fabricated the evidence. Bible scholar Bart D. Ehrman states that "Today there is not a single recognized scholar on the planet who has any doubts about the matter. The entire story was invented by Notovitch, who earned a good deal of money and a substantial amount of notoriety for his hoax".

The Indian Pandit Swami Abhedananda also claims to have read the same manuscript and published his account of viewing it after his visit to Hemis in 1921.<ref> Swami Abhedananda's "Journey into Kashmir and Tibet" rendered into English by Ansupati Dasgupta and Kunja Bihari Kundu. http://www.exoticindiaart.com/book/details/swami-abhedananda-s-journey-into-kashmir-and-tibet-IDJ093/</ref> Abhedananda claims on the book jacket that it was translated for him with the help of a "local Lama interpreter." After Abhedananda's death, one of his disciples admitted that when he went to the monastery to ask about the documents, he was told that they had disappeared. (In the same vein, Notovich did not initially translate the manuscript but said that his Sherpa guide did, as he could not read the original text.) Notovich's version of the manuscript was translated from Tibetan to Russian to French to English. According to Swami Abhedananda's account, his Lama's translation was equivalent to the one published by Notovich. The Gutenberg Project has published Notovich's manuscript as a free ebook.

 Paintings of Mahasiddhas 

In the courtyard of the Monastery there is a gallery with paintings of Mahasiddhas Eighty-Four Mahasiddhas. These are 17th century paintings made with  ground mineral pigments.

Paintings of Mahasiddhas 1 to 14

Hemis Festival
The Hemis Festival is dedicated to Lord Padmasambhava (Guru Rinpoche) venerated as the Dance Performance at Hemis Monastery representative reincarnate of Buddha. He is believed to have been born on the 10th day of the fifth month of the Monkey year as predicted by the Buddha Shakyamuni. It is also believed that his life mission 
is was, and remains, to improve the spiritual condition of all living beings. And so on this day, which comes once in a cycle of 12 years, Hemis observes a major extravaganza in his memory. The observance of these sacred rituals is believed to give spiritual strength and good health. The Hemis festival takes place in the rectangular courtyard in front of the main door of the monastery. The space is wide and open save two raised square platforms, three feet high with a sacred pole in the center. A raised dais with a richly cushioned seat with a finely painted small Tibetan table is placed with the ceremonial items – cups full of holy water, uncooked rice, tormas made of dough and butter and incense sticks. A number of musicians play the traditional music with four pairs of cymbals, large-pan drums, small trumpets and large size wind instruments. Next to them, a small space is assigned for the lamas to sit.

The ceremonies begin with an early morning ritual atop the gompa where, to the beat of drums and the resounding clash of cymbals and the spiritual wail of pipes, the portrait of "Dadmokarpo" or "Rygyalsras Rinpoche" is then ceremoniously put on display for all to admire and worship.

The most esoteric of festivities are the mystic mask dances. The mask dances of Ladakh are referred collectively as chams performance. Chams performance is essentially a part of Tantric tradition, performed only in those gompas which follow the Tantric Vajrayana teachings and the monks perform tantric worship.

Gallery

Footnotes

References
 Francke, A. H. (1914, 1926). Antiquities of Indian Tibet''. Two Volumes. Calcutta. 1972 reprint: S. Chand, New Delhi.

External links

1672 establishments in Asia
Buddhist monasteries in Ladakh
Drukpa Kagyu monasteries and temples
Ladakh